Sys Bjerre (born 15 May 1985, in Vanløse) is a Danish singer-songwriter.

Bjerre broke through in the Danish music scene with the hit Malene in the summer of 2008. Previously, she had sung a duet with Thomas Buttenschøn and been on tour with Tue West. On 28 October 2008 it was publicly announced that Danmarks Radio had accepted her as co-host of Boogie together with Jeppe Voldum. Sys Bjerre was invited to the casting.

Discography

Albums

Singles

as featuring artist

References

External links 
 Fansite regarding Sys Bjerre 
 Officiel hjemmeside og shop

1985 births
Living people
Danish women singer-songwriters
21st-century Danish women singers